John the Apostle (Ge'ez: ዮሐንስ;) or Saint John the Beloved was one of the Twelve Apostles of Jesus according to the New Testament. Generally listed as the youngest apostle, he was the son of Zebedee and Salome. His brother James was another of the Twelve Apostles. The Church Fathers identify him as John the Evangelist, John of Patmos, John the Elder, and the Beloved Disciple, and testify that he outlived the remaining apostles and was the only one to die of natural causes, although modern scholars are divided on the veracity of these claims. 

John the Apostle is traditionally held to be the author of the Gospel of John, and many Christian denominations believe that he authored several other books of the New Testament (the three Johannine epistles and the Book of Revelation, together with the Gospel of John, are called the Johannine works), depending on whether he is distinguished from, or identified with, John the Evangelist, John the Elder, and John of Patmos.

Although the authorship of the Johannine works has traditionally been attributed to John the Apostle, only a minority of contemporary scholars believe he wrote the gospel, and most conclude that he wrote none of them. Regardless of whether or not John the Apostle wrote any of the Johannine works, most scholars agree that all three epistles were written by the same author and that the epistles did not have the same author as the Book of Revelation, although there is widespread disagreement among scholars as to whether the author of the epistles was different from that of the gospel.

References to John in the New Testament

John the Apostle was the son of Zebedee and the younger brother of James the Great. According to church tradition, their mother was Salome. Also according to some traditions, Salome was the sister of Mary, Jesus' mother, making Salome Jesus' aunt, and her sons John the Apostle and James were Jesus' cousins.

Thus, some traditions believe that he was first a disciple of John the Baptist, even though he is not named in this episode. 

According to the Synoptic Gospels (Matt 4:18–22; Mark 1:16–20; Lk 5:1–11), Zebedee and his sons fished in the Sea of Galilee. Jesus then called Peter, Andrew and the two sons of Zebedee to follow him. James and John are listed among the Twelve Apostles. Jesus referred to the pair as "Boanerges" (translated "sons of thunder"). A Gospel story relates how the brothers wanted to call down heavenly fire on an unhospitable Samaritan town, but Jesus rebuked them. John lived on for another generation after the martyrdom of James, who was the first Apostle to die a martyr's death.

Other references to John

John, along with his brother James and Peter, formed an informal triumvirate among the Twelve Apostles in the Gospels. Jesus allowed them to be the only apostles present at three particular occasions during his public ministry, the Raising of Jairus' daughter, Transfiguration of Jesus  and Agony in the Garden of Gethsemane. John was the disciple who reported to Jesus that they had 'forbidden' a non-disciple from casting out demons in Jesus' name, prompting Jesus to state that 'he who is not against us is on our side'.

Jesus sent only John and Peter into the city to make the preparation for the final Passover meal (the Last Supper). 

Many traditions identify the "beloved disciple" in the Gospel of John as the Apostle John, but this identification is debated. At the meal itself, the "disciple whom Jesus loved" sat next to Jesus. It was customary to recline on couches at meals, and this disciple leaned on Jesus. Tradition identifies this disciple as John. After the arrest of Jesus, Peter and the "other disciple" (according to tradition, John) followed him into the palace of the high-priest. The "beloved disciple" alone, among the Apostles, remained near Jesus at the foot of the cross on Calvary alongside myrrhbearers and numerous other women. Following the instruction of Jesus from the Cross, the beloved disciple took Mary, the mother of Jesus, into his care as the last legacy of Jesus. 

After Jesus' Ascension and the descent of the Holy Spirit at Pentecost, John, together with Peter, took a prominent part in the founding and guidance of the church. He was with Peter at the healing of the lame man at Solomon's Porch in the Temple and he was also thrown into prison with Peter. He went with Peter to visit the newly converted believers in Samaria.

While he remained in Judea and the surrounding area, the other disciples returned to Jerusalem for the Apostolic Council (about AD 51). Paul, in opposing his enemies in Galatia, recalls that John explicitly, along with Peter and James the Just, were referred to as "pillars of the church" and refers to the recognition that his Apostolic preaching of a gospel free from Jewish Law received from these three, the most prominent men of the messianic community at Jerusalem.

The disciple whom Jesus loved

The phrase "the disciple whom Jesus loved as a brother", or in John 20:2; "whom Jesus loved as a friend", is used six times in the Gospel of John, but in no other New Testament accounts of Jesus.  claims that the Gospel of John is based on the written testimony of this disciple.

The disciple whom Jesus loved is referred to, specifically, six times in the Gospel of John:

 It is this disciple who, while reclining beside Jesus at the Last Supper, asks Jesus, after being requested by Peter to do so, who it is that will betray him.
 Later at the crucifixion, Jesus tells his mother, "Woman, here is your son", and to the Beloved Disciple he says, "Here is your mother."
 When Mary Magdalene discovers the empty tomb, she runs to tell the Beloved Disciple and Peter. The two men rush to the empty tomb and the Beloved Disciple is the first to reach the empty tomb. However, Peter is the first to enter.
 In John 21, the last chapter of the Gospel of John, the Beloved Disciple is one of seven fishermen involved in the miraculous catch of 153 fish.
 Also in the book's final chapter, after Jesus hints to Peter how Peter will die, Peter sees the Beloved Disciple following them and asks, "What about him?" Jesus answers, "If I want him to remain until I come, what is that to you? You follow Me!"
 Again in the Gospel's last chapter, it states that the very book itself is based on the written testimony of the disciple whom Jesus loved.

None of the other Gospels has anyone in the parallel scenes that could be directly understood as the Beloved Disciple. Mark, Matthew and Luke do not mention any one of the twelve disciples having witnessed the crucifixion.

New Testament author

Church tradition has held that John is the author of the Gospel of John and four other books of the New Testament – the three Epistles of John and the Book of Revelation. The authorship of some Johannine literature has been debated since about the year 200.

In his 4th century Ecclesiastical History, Eusebius says that the First Epistle of John and the Gospel of John are widely agreed upon as his. However, Eusebius mentions that the consensus is that the second and third epistles of John are not his but were written by some other John. Eusebius also goes to some length to establish with the reader that there is no general consensus regarding the revelation of John. The revelation of John could only be what is now called the Book of Revelation. The Gospel according to John differs considerably from the Synoptic Gospels, which were likely written decades earlier. The bishops of Asia Minor supposedly requested him to write his gospel to deal with the heresy of the Ebionites, who asserted that Christ did not exist before Mary. John probably knew of the Gospels of Matthew, Mark, and Luke, but these gospels spoke of Jesus primarily in the year following the imprisonment and death of John the Baptist. Around 600, however, Sophronius of Jerusalem noted that “two epistles bearing his name ... are considered by some to be the work of a certain John the Elder” and, while stating that Revelation was written by John of Patmos, it was “later translated by Justin Martyr and Irenaeus,” presumably in an attempt to reconcile tradition with the obvious differences in Greek style.

Until the 19th century, the authorship of the Gospel of John had been attributed to the Apostle John. However, most modern critical scholars have their doubts. Some scholars place the Gospel of John somewhere between AD 65 and 85; John Robinson proposes an initial edition by 50–55 and then a final edition by 65 due to narrative similarities with Paul. Other scholars are of the opinion that the Gospel of John was composed in two or three stages. Most contemporary scholars consider that the Gospel was not written until the latter third of the first century AD, and with the earliest possible date of AD 75–80: “...a date of AD 75–80 as the earliest possible date of composition for this Gospel.” Other scholars think that an even later date, perhaps even the last decade of the first century AD right up to the start of the 2nd century (i.e. 90 – 100), is applicable.

Nonetheless, today many theological scholars continue to accept the traditional authorship. Colin G. Kruse states that since John the Evangelist has been named consistently in the writings of early Church Fathers, “it is hard to pass by this conclusion, despite widespread reluctance to accept it by many, but by no means all, modern scholars.”

Modern, mainstream Bible scholars generally assert that the Gospel of John has been  written by an anonymous author.

Regarding whether the author of the Gospel of John was an eyewitness, according to Paul N. Anderson, the gospel “contains more direct claims to eyewitness origins than any of the other Gospel traditions.” F. F. Bruce argues that 19:35 contains an “emphatic and explicit claim to eyewitness authority.” The gospel nowhere claims to have been written by direct witnesses to the reported events.

Mainstream Bible scholars assert that all four gospels from the New Testament are fundamentally anonymous and most of mainstream scholars agree that these gospels have not been written by eyewitnesses. As The New Oxford Annotated Bible (2018) has put it, "Scholars generally agree that the Gospels were written forty to sixty years after the death of Jesus."

Book of Revelation
According to the Book of Revelation, its author was on the island of Patmos "for the word of God and for the testimony of Jesus", when he was honoured with the vision contained in Revelation.

The author of the Book of Revelation identifies himself as "Ἰωάννης" ("John" in standard English translation). The early 2nd century writer, Justin Martyr, was the first to equate the author of Revelation with John the Apostle. However, most biblical scholars now contend that these were separate individuals since the text was written around 100 AD, after the death of John the Apostle, although many historians have defended the identification of the Author of the Gospel of John with that of the Book of Revelation based on the similarity of the two texts.

John the Presbyter, an obscure figure in the early church, has also been identified with the seer of the Book of Revelation by such authors as Eusebius in his Church History (Book III, 39) and Jerome.

John is considered to have been exiled to Patmos, during the persecutions under Emperor Domitian. Revelation 1:9 says that the author wrote the book on Patmos: “I, John, both your brother and companion in tribulation, ... was on the island that is called Patmos for the word of God and for the testimony of Jesus Christ.” Adela Yarbro Collins, a biblical scholar at Yale Divinity School, writes:

Some modern critical scholars have raised the possibility that John the Apostle, John the Evangelist, and John of Patmos were three separate individuals. These scholars assert that John of Patmos wrote Revelation but neither the Gospel of John nor the Epistles of John. The author of Revelation identifies himself as “John” several times, but the author of the Gospel of John never identifies himself directly. Some Catholic scholars state that "vocabulary, grammar, and style make it doubtful that the book could have been put into its present form by the same person(s) responsible for the fourth gospel."

Extrabiblical traditions

There is no information in the Bible concerning the duration of John's activity in Judea. According to tradition, John and the other Apostles remained some 12 years in this first field of labour. The persecution of Christians under Herod Agrippa I (r. 41–44 AD) led to the scattering of the Apostles through the Roman Empire's provinces.

A messianic community existed at Ephesus before Paul's first labors there (cf. "the brethren"), in addition to Priscilla and Aquila. The original community was under the leadership of Apollos (1 Corinthians 1:12). They were disciples of John the Baptist and were converted by Aquila and Priscilla. According to tradition, after the Assumption of Mary, John went to Ephesus. Irenaeus writes of "the church of Ephesus, founded by Paul, with John continuing with them until the times of Trajan." From Ephesus he wrote the three epistles attributed to him. John was allegedly banished by the Roman authorities to the Greek island of Patmos, where, according to tradition, he wrote the Book of Revelation. According to Tertullian (in The Prescription of Heretics) John was banished (presumably to Patmos) after being plunged into boiling oil in Rome and suffering nothing from it. It is said that all in the audience of Colosseum were converted to Christianity upon witnessing this miracle. This event would have occurred in the late 1st century, during the reign of the Emperor Domitian, who was known for his persecution of Christians.

When John was aged, he trained Polycarp who later became Bishop of Smyrna. This was important because Polycarp was able to carry John's message to future generations. Polycarp taught Irenaeus, passing on to him stories about John. Similarly, Ignatius of Antioch was a student of John. In Against Heresies, Irenaeus relates how Polycarp told a story of 

It is traditionally believed that John was the youngest of the apostles and survived them. He is said to have lived to old age, dying at Ephesus sometime after AD 98, during the reign of Trajan.

An alternative account of John's death, ascribed by later Christian writers to the early second-century bishop Papias of Hierapolis, claims that he was slain by the Jews. Most Johannine scholars doubt the reliability of its ascription to Papias, but a minority, including B.W. Bacon, Martin Hengel and Henry Barclay Swete, maintain that these references to Papias are credible. Zahn argues that this reference is actually to John the Baptist. John's traditional tomb is thought to be located in the former basilica of Saint John at Selçuk, a small town in the vicinity of Ephesus.

John is also associated with the pseudepigraphal apocryphal text of the Acts of John, which is traditionally viewed as written by John himself or his disciple, Leucius Charinus. It was widely circulated by the second century CE but deemed heretical at the Second Council of Nicaea (787 CE). Varying fragments survived in Greek and Latin within monastic libraries. It contains strong docetic themes, but is not considered in modern scholarship to be Gnostic.

Liturgical commemoration
The feast day of Saint John in the Roman Catholic Church, which calls him "Saint John, Apostle and Evangelist", and in the Anglican Communion and Lutheran Calendars, which call him "Saint John the Apostle and Evangelist", is on 27 December. In the Tridentine Calendar he was commemorated also on each of the following days up to and including 3 January, the Octave of the 27 December feast. This Octave was abolished by Pope Pius XII in 1955. The traditional liturgical color is white. John, Apostle and Evangelist is remembered in the Church of England with a Festival on 27 December. In Roman Catholic tradition he considered patron of Turkey, Asia Minor and Turkish people.

Until 1960, another feast day which appeared in the General Roman Calendar is that of "Saint John Before the Latin Gate" on 6 May, celebrating a tradition recounted by Jerome that St John was brought to Rome during the reign of the Emperor Domitian, and was thrown in a vat of boiling oil, from which he was miraculously preserved unharmed. A church (San Giovanni a Porta Latina) dedicated to him was built near the Latin gate of Rome, the traditional site of this event.

The Eastern Orthodox Church and those Eastern Catholic Churches which follow the Byzantine Rite commemorate the "Repose of the Holy Apostle and Evangelist John the Theologian" on 26 September. On 8 May they celebrate the "Feast of the Holy Apostle and Evangelist John the Theologian", on which date Christians used to draw forth from his grave fine ashes which were believed to be effective for healing the sick.

Other views

Islamic view
The Quran also speaks of Jesus's disciples but does not mention their names, instead referring to them as "supporters for [the cause of] Allah". The Sunnah did not mention their names either. However, some Muslim scholars mentioned their names, likely relying on the resources of Christians, who are considered "People of the Book" in Islamic tradition. Muslim exegesis more-or-less agrees with the New Testament list and says that the disciples included Peter, Philip, Thomas, Bartholomew, Matthew, Andrew, James, Jude, John and Simon the Zealot. Notably, narrations of People of the Book (Christians and Jews) are not to be believed or disbelieved by Muslims as long as there is nothing that supports or denies them in Quran or Sunnah.

Latter-day Saint view

The Church of Jesus Christ of Latter-day Saints (LDS Church) teaches that, "John is mentioned frequently in latter-day revelation (1 Ne. 14:18–27; 3 Ne. 28:6; Ether 4:16; D&C 7; 27:12; 61:14; 77; 88:141). For Latter-day Saints these passages confirm the biblical record of John and also provide insight into his greatness and the importance of the work the Lord has given him to do on the earth in New Testament times and in the last days. The latter-day scriptures clarify that John did not die but was allowed to remain on the earth as a ministering servant until the time of the Lord’s Second Coming (John 21:20–23; 3 Ne. 28:6–7; D&C 7)". It also teaches that in 1829, along with the resurrected Peter and the resurrected James, John visited Joseph Smith and Oliver Cowdery and restored the priesthood authority with Apostolic succession to earth. Latter-day Saint historians claim that previous editions of latter-day scripture contradict this claim of priesthood authority and Apostolic Succession. John, along with the Three Nephites, will live to see the Second Coming of Christ as translated beings.

The LDS Church teaches that John the Apostle is the same person as John the Evangelist, John of Patmos, and the Beloved Disciple.

In art

As he was traditionally identified with the beloved apostle, the evangelist, and the author of the Revelation and several Epistles, John played an extremely prominent role in art from the early Christian period onward. He is traditionally depicted in one of two distinct ways: either as an aged man with a white or gray beard, or alternatively as a beardless youth. The first way of depicting him was more common in Byzantine art, where it was possibly influenced by antique depictions of Socrates; the second was more common in the art of Medieval Western Europe, and can be dated back as far as 4th century Rome.

Legends from the Acts of John, an apocryphal text attributed to John, contributed much to Medieval iconography; it is the source of the idea that John became an apostle at a young age. One of John's familiar attributes is the chalice, often with a serpent emerging from it. This symbol is interpreted as a reference to a legend from the Acts of John, in which John was challenged to drink a cup of poison to demonstrate the power of his faith (the poison being symbolized by the serpent). Other common attributes include a book or scroll, in reference to the writings traditionally attributed to him, and an eagle, which is argued to symbolize the high-soaring, inspirational quality of these writings.

In Medieval and through to Renaissance works of painting, sculpture and literature, Saint John is often presented in an androgynous or feminized manner. Historians have related such portrayals to the circumstances of the believers for whom they were intended. For instance, John's feminine features are argued to have helped to make him more relatable to women. Likewise, Sarah McNamer argues that because of his status as an androgynous saint, John could function as an "image of a third or mixed gender" and "a crucial figure with whom to identify" for male believers who sought to cultivate an attitude of affective piety, a highly emotional style of devotion that, in late-medieval culture, was thought to be poorly compatible with masculinity. After the Middle Ages, feminizing portrayals of Saint John continued to be made; a case in point is an etching by Jacques Bellange, shown to the right, described by art critic Richard Dorment as depicting "a softly androgynous creature with a corona of frizzy hair, small breasts like a teenage girl, and the round belly of a mature woman."

In the realm of popular media, this latter phenomenon was brought to notice in Dan Brown's novel The Da Vinci Code (2003), where one of the book's characters suggests that the feminine-looking person to Jesus' right in Leonardo da Vinci's The Last Supper is actually Mary Magdalene rather than St. John.

Gallery of art

See also
 Basilica of St. John
 Four Evangelists
 List of biblical figures identified in extra-biblical sources
 Names of John
 St. John the Evangelist on Patmos
 Vision of St. John on Patmos, 1520–1522 frescos by Antonio da Correggio
 Acts of John, a pseudepigraphal account of John's miracle work
 Saint John the Apostle, patron saint archive

References

Sources

External links

 Eastern Orthodox icon and Synaxarion of Saint John the Apostle and Evangelist (May 8)
 John the Apostle in Art
 John in Art
 Repose of the Holy Apostle and Evangelist John the Theologian Orthodox icon and synaxarion for September 26
 
 
 

 
AD 6 births
Year of death unknown
Christian saints from the New Testament
1st-century Christian theologians
1st-century Christian mystics
2nd-century Christian theologians
2nd-century Christian mystics
Anglican saints
Angelic visionaries
Book of Revelation
Burials in Turkey
Jewish Christian mystics
Ancient letter writers
Family of Jesus
Twelve Apostles
Saints from the Holy Land
Ancient Jewish fishers
People from Bethsaida
Judean people
Miracle workers
eo:Sankta Johano la Evangeliisto